The Metropolitan Corporation Islamabad (MCI) (Urdu: بلدیہ عظمی اسلام آباد) is a municipal authority established under the ICT Local Government Act 2015 in Islamabad Capital Territory, Pakistan. The corporation is headed by the Mayor and includes Chairman UCs and others.

The MCI is responsible for various activities in the Capital Territory including waste management, environmental protections, and developmental works to name a few. According to its official website, the Mayor has outlined various initiatives to be taken for the development of the city including; construction of a town hall, provision of water supply from Ghazi Barotha dam, formation of a solid waste management company, etc.

Since its inception it was established that the functions of planning, building control section, sanitation, road maintenance, environment, water supply, play grounds, sports directorate and all municipal services will be overtaken by the Islamabad Corporation, transferring it from CDA hands.

References

Metropolitan corporations in Pakistan
Government of Islamabad
Companies based in Islamabad